Long Day's Journey into Night (literally "Last evenings on Earth") is a 2018 Chinese drama film directed by Bi Gan. The film was screened in the Un Certain Regard section at the 2018 Cannes Film Festival. Despite the film's English-language title, it is unrelated to the 1956 Eugene O'Neill play of the same name. It is notable for its final 59 minutes, which consists of one unbroken long take in 3D.

Plot
In the opening scene, Luo Hongwu (Huang Jue) remarks to a prostitute after intercourse how he is haunted by the memory of a woman who disappeared. The story of his involvement with that woman is then told in a chiefly non-linear, out-of-order series of scenes that resist easy explanation.

Luo's hometown is Kaili, where he and his friend Wildcat grew up. Wildcat was to sell a quantity of apples to the sadistic gangster Zuo Hongyuan (Yongzhong Chen) and enlisted Luo's help, but Luo forgot and Wildcat was later murdered by Zuo for failure to deliver. Luo eventually discovered the apple sale was a means to smuggle a gun.

Luo, himself connected to organized crime as a casino manager, attempts to track down Zuo through his girlfriend Wan Qiwen (Tang Wei). Wan had been a cat burglar and had broken into a home with another woman, but they were distracted by a book with a poetry spell that could make the entire house itself spin. The inhabitants returned unexpectedly causing them to flee with the most valuable item they could grab; when they made it to the woods, the only thing Wan had was a green book with the poem. Luo finds her on a train and their initially brutal meeting turns into passion. The green book enters his possession when she leaves it on a wall; it is unclear if she meant to give it to him or discard it.

Wan convinces Luo to murder Zuo in a movie theatre by shooting him through the back of his seat, and he disposes of the body in an abandoned mine. She disappears afterwards and is never seen again. Luo is able to retrace some of her steps but fails to find her.

Years later, Luo returns to Kaili for his father's funeral. A picture in the clock that used to hang in his father's restaurant has a phone number written on the back, but it is disconnected. He finds Wan's burglary accomplice (Yanmin Bi) in prison for other crimes, who explains the story of the house to him and says that if he has the green book, he must have been very special to her.

Luo's travels take him to a rundown town where he sees her name on a faded poster next to a strip joint. He rebuffs a prostitute who solicits him, only interested in knowing if Wan will be there. The prostitute advises him to wait at the movie theatre until the strip club opens. As the feature at the movie theatre begins, the on-screen audience puts on their 3D glasses, a signal to the real audience to do the same.

The final scene is an unbroken continuous 59-minute sequence in 3D and is ambiguous about whether it represents a dream or reality. Luo finds himself on a railway track in an abandoned mine. The handcart takes him up to a small office, where a preteen boy challenges Luo to a game of ping-pong in return for helping him find his way out. Luo easily bests the boy with a unique spin serve and the boy gives him his paddle in appreciation, which he says enables one to fly. The boy takes him on a scooter out of the mine and places him on a chairlift down to a mountain village. The chairlift exits in a pool hall; the red-jacketed proprietress resembles Wan, but is not her. They spin the paddle and it brings them to the village square where Wan was supposed to be; a traveling karaoke show has arrived in the meantime, transported by a truck that passed Luo's van in an earlier scene. He sees Wildcat's mother (Sylvia Chang), her hair dyed a brilliant red, and forces her faithless lover to take her along. Luo and the proprietress find a ruined home she says was once beautiful. A poem is read and the room spins about them as they kiss.

Cast
 Huang Jue as Luo Hongwu
 Tang Wei as Wan Qiwen/Kaizhen
 Sylvia Chang as Wildcat's Mom/Red-hair Woman
 Lee Hong-chi as Wildcat
 Chloe Maayan as Pager
 Ming Dao as Traffic Police

Production
Director Bi Gan enlisted novelist Chang Ta-Chun as a consultant for the script, noting that Ta-Chun aided in the overall film structure as well as the division of the film into two parts. Of the two parts, Bi noted that "the title of the first part is Memory; that of the second is Poppy, in reference to Paul Celan’s poem Poppy and Memory. At some point, I even considered using this as the film’s title."

Bi stated that "I liked the idea that the first half would be in 2D, because I wanted it to feel as fragmented as time, with little bits of memory... With the second half, I wanted it to be real-time, and the 3D was the best way to create a spatial experience for that." The 59-minute unbroken long take 3D sequence that closes the film took two months to prepare, as techniques had to be devised to move a RED camera through the complicated environment of the scene. It took seven attempts at shooting the sequence before Bi was satisfied. The sequence was shot in 2D and converted to 3D in post-production because a 2D camera was lighter and therefore easier to move in difficult positions and small environments.

In reference to the use of 2D and 3D, Bi said:

The film is notable for utilizing three cinematographers - Yao Hung-I, Dong Jinsong, and David Chizallet. Their individual roles were broken down by Gan, who stated that "Yao Hung-I began shooting the first part. We worked together for several months and then he went back to Taiwan. Dong Jinsong then took over for half of the part in 2D and the preparation of the final sequence shot that David Chizallet eventually shot. Chizallet also shot one scene of the part in 2D."

Bi stated that he had difficulty choosing a title for the film, noting that the official international title is "Long Day's Journey into Night," a title inspired by the play of the same name by Eugene O'Neill, whereas the direct Chinese translation is "Last Evenings on Earth," which refers to a short story written by Chilean author Roberto Bolaño. Regarding the two titles, Bi noted that he wanted to choose titles that "matched with the film's spirit" and that he ultimately chose them because they related to two works of literature he admired.

Bi drew inspiration for the film from the paintings of Marc Chagall, specifically The Promenade, as well as the novels of Patrick Modiano.

Reception

Box office
Despite its unusual story structure, the film was marketed and distributed in China as a romantic event film, and an ideal date movie for its New Year's Eve release. It also received a wide theatrical release. The strategy worked; by 25 December, the film had already sold 100 million yuan ($15 million US dollars) in presales tickets. Despite its strong presales, it faded quickly from the box-office charts, having grossed $41 million US during its initial three weeks (most of it from its 31 December premier).

In China, its massive early box office success led to a backlash; the hashtag “can’t understand Long Day’s Journey Into Night” trended on social media, and users of the ticketing platform Maoyan drove its aggregate user rating down.

Critical response
The website's critical consensus reads, "Long Day's Journey Into Night may flummox viewers looking for an easy-to-follow story, but writer-director Gan Bi's strong visual command and technical risk-taking pay off." Metacritic, which uses a weighted average, assigned a score of 88 out of 100 based on 23 critics, indicating "universal acclaim." The film's final 3D sequence, in particular, drew substantial praise at its 2018 Cannes Film Festival debut.

Many critics praised the final, hour-long dream sequence which was filmed in one continuous take. In his 4/4 star review for The Boston Globe, critic Ty Burr compared the sequence to his own dreams, noting that they are often "unsettling, unstoppable, and yet there’s often a logic within their illogic. This is precisely what Bi has re-created in the final hour of “Long Day’s Journey Into Night,” a fluid and outrageously extended camera shot that, as with dreams, doesn’t need editing to cast its spell." Peter Bradshaw lauded the dream sequence as "a kind of slo-mo exhilaration" in his 5/5 star review for The Guardian. He proceeded to reflect on how the unbroken dream sequence allows the viewer to think about memories not as simple, disconnected flashbacks, but rather as complex, subliminal flashes which lack any significant substance until one is created for them. When viewed in this light, he states that "memory becomes a creative act, a developmental fleshing-out of a fleeting glimpse or feeling."

Awards and nominations

Notes

References

External links
  
 
 Long Day's Journey into Night at Rotten Tomatoes

2018 films
2018 drama films
Chinese drama films
Films directed by Bi Gan
2010s Mandarin-language films